ER = EPR is a conjecture in physics stating that two entangled particles (a so-called Einstein–Podolsky–Rosen or EPR pair) are connected by a wormhole (or Einstein–Rosen bridge) and is thought by some to be a basis for unifying general relativity and quantum mechanics into a theory of everything.

Overview
The conjecture was proposed by Leonard Susskind and Juan Maldacena in 2013. They proposed that a wormhole (Einstein–Rosen bridge or ER bridge) is equivalent to a pair of maximally entangled black holes. EPR refers to quantum entanglement (EPR paradox).

The symbol is derived from the first letters of the surnames of authors who wrote the first paper on wormholes (Albert Einstein and Nathan Rosen) and the first paper on entanglement (Einstein, Boris Podolsky and Rosen). The two papers were published in 1935, but the authors did not claim any connection between the concepts.

Conjectured resolution
This is a conjectured resolution to the AMPS firewall paradox. Whether or not there is a firewall depends upon what is thrown into the other distant black hole. However, as the firewall lies inside the event horizon, no external superluminal signalling would be possible.

This conjecture is an extrapolation of the observation by Mark Van Raamsdonk that a maximally extended AdS-Schwarzschild black hole, which is a non-traversable wormhole, is dual to a pair of maximally entangled thermal conformal field theories via the AdS/CFT correspondence.

They backed up their conjecture by showing that the pair production of charged black holes in a background magnetic field leads to entangled black holes, but also, after Wick rotation, to a wormhole.

This conjecture sits uncomfortably with the linearity of quantum mechanics. An entangled state is a linear superposition of separable states. Presumably, separable states are not connected by any wormholes, but yet a superposition of such states is connected by a wormhole.

The authors pushed this conjecture even further by claiming any entangled pair of particles—even particles not ordinarily considered to be black holes, and pairs of particles with different masses or spin, or with charges which aren't opposite—are connected by Planck scale wormholes.

The conjecture leads to a grander conjecture that the geometry of space, time and gravity is determined by entanglement.

References

External links
 Susskind, Leonard. "ER = EPR" or "What's Behind the Horizons of Black Holes?". Stanford Institute for Theoretical Physics. November. 4, 2014.

Black holes
Conjectures
Quantum gravity